Cuenca Minera is a comarca (county) (with no administrative role) in Andalusia, southern Spain.

It is located in the western part of the province of Huelva, bounded eastwards by the province of Seville, from south by the comarca of El Condado and from north by the Sierra de Huelva.

Comarcas of Andalusia
Geography of the Province of Huelva